Jean Claude Trénonay de Chanfrey (1733–1792) was a wealthy slave-owner who owned a plantation near Point Coupee, Spanish Louisiana.
 
Claude was the nephew and heir of Trénonay de Chanfret, who had been the sub-delegate of the Ordonnateur Michel in Point Coupee.

He died on 9 July 1792 when Latulipe, an enslaved Ibo, shot him with a musket while he was eating his dinner.

His nephew Armand Duplantier inherited his estate after his death.

References

1792 deaths
French slave traders
1733 births
18th-century French businesspeople
People of Colonial Spanish Louisiana
French slave owners